Cyperus cracens is a sedge of the family Cyperaceae that is native to northern and north western parts of Australia.

The species was first described by the botanist Karen Louise Wilson in 1991 in the journal Telopea.

It is found in rock crevices and seepage areas on sandstone hills in the Kimberley region of Western Australia and is also found in the Northern Territory.

See also
List of Cyperus species

References

Plants described in 1991
Flora of Western Australia
cracens
Taxa named by Karen Louise Wilson
Flora of the Northern Territory